Tussen-die-Riviere Nature Reserve is a 22 000 ha nature reserve wedged between the Orange River and the Caledon River in the southern Free State, South Africa.

Accommodation

There are nine self-catering chalets and five hunter's huts available on the reserve. Some 120 km of dirt roads are made available for game viewing with visitors' own vehicles.

Wildlife

Antelopes
Blesbok
Black wildebeest and Blue wildebeest
Eland
Gemsbok 
Kudu
Mountain reedbuck
Red hartebeest
Springbok
Steenbok
White rhino
Zebra

References

External links 
 Tussen-die-Riviere Nature Reserve

Nature reserves in South Africa
Protected areas of the Free State (province)